The Barbados Triple Crown of Thoroughbred Racing is a series of thoroughbred horse races run annually at Garrison Savannah Racetrack near Bridgetown, Barbados. 

The Triple Crown series consists of races of increasing distance:
 Barbados Guineas - 7.8 furlongs, run in mid April
 Midsummer Creole Classic - 9 furlongs (1⅛ mile), run in early July
 Barbados Derby - 10 furlongs (1¼ miles), run in early August

References
Horse-racing events in Barbados

Triple Crown of Thoroughbred Racing
Racing series for horses
Horse racing in Barbados